Ziyarat Shah (also Romanized as Zīyārat Shāh; also known as Zīārat) is a village in Gonbaki Rural District, in the Central District of Rigan County, Kerman Province, Iran. At the 2006 census, its population was 629, in 121 families.

References 

Populated places in Rigan County